LDV Hospitality is a restaurant group based in New York City, founded in 2008 by John Meadow. , LDV has 28 restaurants across the U.S. and in London, including flagship Modern Italian restaurant Scarpetta, which received a three star review from The New York Times. LDV restaurants are located in New York, Miami Beach, The Hamptons, Newport, Buckhead Atlanta, Philadelphia, Las Vegas and London.

References

2009 establishments in New York City
Companies based in New York City
Restaurants established in 2009
Restaurant chains in the United States
American companies established in 2009